Nicole Berline (born 1944) is a French mathematician.

Life and work 
In 1967, she taught at the ENS de Jeunes filles and in 1971, she worked for the CNRS (Attachée de recherches). In 1974 she received her doctorate at the University of Paris under the supervision of Jacques Dixmier. In 1976/77 she was a visiting professor at the University of California, Berkeley. In 1977 she became a professor at the University of Rennes 1 and she has taught at the Ecole Polytechnique since 1984.

She worked in the index theory of elliptic differential operators along the lines of the Atiyah-Singer index theorem and symplectic geometry.

Publications 
With Ezra Getzler, Michèle Vergne, "Heat kernels and Dirac operators", in the series called Principles of mathematical sciences 298, Springer Verlag, 1992, 2004

References 

The original article was a machine translation of the corresponding German article.

External links 
Homepage
CV

20th-century French mathematicians
21st-century French mathematicians
1944 births
Living people
French women mathematicians
20th-century women mathematicians
21st-century women mathematicians
20th-century French women
21st-century French women